Kader Klouchi (born 1 June 1969 in Tipaza, Algeria) was a French-Algerian long jumper. He competed in the 1992 Barcelona Summer Olympics for Algeria.  He is also an artist with works on display with the Art of the Olympians.

References

1969 births
Living people
People from Tipaza
French male long jumpers
Algerian male long jumpers
Olympic athletes of Algeria
Athletes (track and field) at the 1992 Summer Olympics
21st-century Algerian people